Anticarsia is a genus of moths of the family Erebidae. The genus was erected by Jacob Hübner in 1818.

Species
 Anticarsia acutilinea (Walker, 1865)
 Anticarsia albilineata Hampson, 1926
 Anticarsia anisospila (Walker, 1869)
 Anticarsia disticha Hampson, 1926
 Anticarsia distorta Hampson, 1926
 Anticarsia gemmatalis Hübner, 1818 – velvetbean moth
 Anticarsia irrorata (Fabricius, 1781)
 Anticarsia parana (Guenée, 1852)
 Anticarsia renipunctum (Berio, 1977)
 Anticarsia suffervens Dyar, 1920
 Anticarsia tigris (Berio, 1977)
 Anticarsia unilineata Gaede, 1940

References

Eulepidotinae
Moth genera